The Marquesas tropical moist forests is a tropical and subtropical moist broadleaf forests ecoregion in the Marquesas Islands of French Polynesia.

Geography

The Marquesas Islands include 12 major islands of volcanic origin. They extend northwest to southeast between 8º and 11º S latitude and 139º and 141º W longitude.

The islands are volcanic in origin, created by the slow west-northwest movement of the Pacific Plate over the Marquesas hotspot. The northwestern islands are approximately 6 million years old, and the southeast islands are younger at 1.3 million years old.

The islands are composed of basalt rock, and have mountainous terrain with sharp ridges, deep canyons, and steep cliffs. The largest and highest islands are:
Nuku Hiva (
Hiva Oa (
Ua Pou (
Fatu Hiva (
Ua Huka (
Eiao

Climate
The islands have a tropical climate. Average annual rainfall varies with elevation and orientation, from 500 mm on leeward lowlands to 4000 mm or more on windward slopes above 1000 meters on the five highest islands. Trade winds blow from the southeast during most of the year, and the windward eastern slopes tend to be wetter than the leeward western slopes. The east-facing mountain slopes are cooler, with mean temperatures of 15º to 25º C, while the hottest mean temperatures (25º to 29ºC) are in the dry western lowlands.

Flora
The natural vegetation is principally tropical moist forest, which varies in height and species composition with rainfall and elevation.

Lowland forests extend up to about 300 m with areas of up to 2000 mm of annual rainfall. Typical lowland forests are dominated by Pisonia grandis, which forms a canopy up to 15 meters high, along with the trees Thespesia populnea, Calophyllum inophyllum, and Terminalia glabrata. Tropical dry forest occurred on drier leeward slopes of the larger islands, characterized by species of Hibiscus, Pandanus, Thespesia, and Cordia.

Mid-elevation forests occur between 300 and 800 meters elevation, with annual rainfall of 2,000 to 3,000 mm. Typical trees include Hibiscus tiliaceus, Pandanus tectorius, Alphitonia marquesensis, and Weinmannia parviflora, which form a canopy up to 20 meters high. Understory plants include Angiopteris evecta and Cyclophyllum barbatum. From 800 to 1000 meters elevation, Hernandia nukuhivensis, and the tree ferns Cyathea affinis and C. feanii predominate in wet areas, and Metrosideros collina and Weinmannia parviflora on drier slopes. A cloud forest belt occurs above 1000 meters elevation, with a low-canopied forest of Cheirodendron bastardianum, Ilex anomala, and Metrosideros collina, with climbers of Freycinetia spp.

Mountaintops above 1,200 m are drier and windswept, supporting a heathland of low trees and shrubs up to one meter high, including M. collina, Vaccinium cereum, Styphelia tameiameiae, and Bidens spp., interspersed with grasses and ferns.

42% of the 320 native vascular plant species are endemic.

Fauna
The ancestors of the Marquesas' native fauna arrived via long-distance dispersal from other islands, and evolved into distinct forms over millions of years.

The ecoregion has 19 breeding seabird species and 11 resident land birds, including ten endemic bird species.
Endemic species include the Marquesas ground dove (Gallicolumba rubescens), Marquesas kingfisher (Halcyon godeffroyi), Fatuhiva monarch (Pomarea whitneyi), Iphis monarch (P. iphis), and Marquesas monarch (P. mendozae). Most endemic species have been decimated by introduced rats, which prey on eggs and chicks. The Nuku Hiva pigeon (Ducula galeata) is now limited to a few hundred individuals on Nuku Hiva. The ultramarine lory (Vini ultramarina) once ranged across the archipelago, but predation by introduced black rats reduced its range to Ua Huka island. The birds were reintroduced on Fatu Hiva in conjunction with a rat control program. The red-moustached fruit dove (Ptilinopus mercierii) is now extinct.

The Marquesas are home to at least 78 species of land and freshwater snails.

Conservation and threats
Humans have extensively altered the flora and fauna of the islands since the arrival of Polynesians about a thousand years ago. Polynesian settlers brought plants like the coconut palm (Cocos nucifera) and candlenut tree (Aleurites moluccana) which have naturalized across the archipelago, as well as pigs and the Polynesian rat (Rattus exulans). Europeans started visiting the islands in the 18th century and later conquered and settled there. Europeans brought with them many more exotic plants and animals, including black rats (Rattus rattus) which have decimated the islands' birds.

Relatively intact natural vegetation covers about 43% of the ecoregion. Most of the lowlands have been cleared for agriculture and pasture, and very little lowland forest remains.

Protected areas
A 2017 assessment found that 37 km², or 7%, of the ecoregion is in protected areas.

References

External links
 
 Marquesas tropical moist forests (DOPA)
 Marquesas tropical moist forests (Encyclopedia of Earth)

Marquesas Islands
Ecoregions of French Polynesia
Oceanian ecoregions
Tropical and subtropical moist broadleaf forests
Endemic Bird Areas